Stade Jules Deschaseaux is a multi-purpose stadium in Le Havre, France. It is used mostly for football matches. The stadium is able to hold 16,400 people and was built in 1932. 

It hosted one match at the 1938 FIFA World Cup between Czechoslovakia and the Netherlands.

In 2012, it was replaced by the newly constructed Stade Océane.

References

Jules Deschaseaux
1938 FIFA World Cup stadiums
Le Havre AC
Sports venues in Seine-Maritime
Multi-purpose stadiums in France
Buildings and structures in Le Havre
Sports venues completed in 1932